Banya Palace (dvorets v Banya) is a royal summer villa or small palace on the northern outskirts of the town of Banya in Karlovo municipality, Plovdiv Province, southern Bulgaria. It was commissioned to University of Karlsruhe-educated architect Ivan Vasilyov after Tsar Boris III of Bulgaria visited the town in 1925 and liked the climatic conditions and the curative mineral springs in the area, and finished in 1929.

The white-painted palace's architecture draws heavily from 19th-century Bulgarian National Revival architecture. It features a large veranda covered with Italian terracotta and with five oak columns supporting it, windows with shutters and a high stone wall with two oak gates. Besides the villa, there are two additional buildings for guests and servants.

The villa also has a small park of 7,000 m²  and the surrounding lots were also improved. Among the plants that can be seen are the Ginkgo, red oak, sweetgum and others.

Today the palace is a private property of the deposed Tsar Simeon II and his official place of residence.

References

 
 
 

Palaces in Bulgaria
Royal residences in Bulgaria
Buildings and structures in Plovdiv Province
Residential buildings completed in 1929
Villas in Bulgaria